Eduardo de la Peña (born 21 July 1967) is a boxer who represented Guam. He competed in the men's lightweight event at the 1988 Summer Olympics.

References

External links
 

1967 births
Living people
Guamanian male boxers
Olympic boxers of Guam
Boxers at the 1988 Summer Olympics
Place of birth missing (living people)
Lightweight boxers